John Newberry may refer to:

John Newberry (ice hockey), Canadian professional ice hockey player
John Strong Newberry (1822-1892), American geologist and explorer
John Stoughton Newberry (1826-1887), American congressman and industrialist from Michigan

See also
John Newbery (1713-1767), British publisher of children's books